The women's 100 metres hurdles event at the 2015 Military World Games was held on 6 October at the KAFAC Sports Complex.

Records
Prior to this competition, the existing world and CISM record were as follows:

Schedule

Medalists

Results

Final

References

400 metres hurdles
2015 in women's athletics